Extra credit may refer to:
Extra credit, the academic concept
Extra Credits, a web series on video games and game studies
Extra Credit, a 2009 children's novel
Extra Credit (EP), a musical recording by Jason Mraz